The Malaysian Journal of Library and Information Science is a triannual peer-reviewed open access academic journal covering library science. It is published by the Department of Library and Information Science of the University of Malaya and the editor-in-chief is Abrizah Abdullah (University of Malaya). Between 1996 and 2008 the journal was published both in print and electronically. Since 2009 only the electronic version has been made available.

Abstracting and indexing
The journal is abstracted and indexed in Library and Information Science Abstracts, Library, Information Science & Technology Abstracts, Library Literature and Information Science, Scopus, and the Social Sciences Citation Index. According to the Journal Citation Reports, the journal has a 2016 impact factor of 0.650.

References

External links

Library and information science journals
Publications established in 1996
Open access journals
Triannual journals
English-language journals